The Cotton Belt Depot Museum is a museum located in the historic railroad depot in Tyler, Texas.

History
Tyler, Texas, had been a railroad hub since the Houston and Great Northern first came through the town in 1873. The depot was opened in 1905. The passenger service ceased in April 1956 and it has been used for different purposes until it was donated to the City of Tyler in 1988. In 2003, following a major renovation the space was shared by the Tyler Transit Department and the museum. Tyler Transit occupies the waiting area and the museum occupies what used to be the baggage storage area.

The museum is run by the Cotton Belt Rail Historical Society Tyler Tap Chapter, which was part of the Cotton Belt Rail Historical Society before breaking off to form a separate organization.

Museum
The model train collection of Mr. and Mrs. Clyde Bragg is the bulk of the hands-on exhibit.  Other artifacts and memorabilia have been donated by various individuals.

Gallery

See also

Carnegie History Center
Goodman-LeGrand House
List of museums in East Texas
St. Louis Southwestern Railway
Tyler Museum of Art
Whitaker-McClendon House
National Register of Historic Places listings in Smith County, Texas

References

External links

Cotton Belt Depot Museum
Cotton Belt Rail Historical Society Tyler Tap Chapter
Cotton Belt Rail Historical Society
 Cotton Belt Rail Historical Society (Older Site Archive)

Railroad museums in Texas
Museums in Tyler, Texas
Railway stations in the United States opened in 1905
Railway stations closed in 1956
Former railway stations in Texas
National Register of Historic Places in Smith County, Texas
Prairie School architecture in Texas
Railway stations on the National Register of Historic Places in Texas
Tyler